Dagapela is a settlement in the south of Bhutan. It is located in Dagana District, to the southeast of the town of Dagana.
At the 2005 census, its population was 145.

References 
Armington, S. (2002) Bhutan. (2nd ed.) Melbourne: Lonely Planet.

Populated places in Bhutan